Honeymoon on Mars is the fourth studio album by English post-punk band The Pop Group, released on 28 October 2016 by Freaks R Us. It is the band's second studio album since their reunion in 2010.

Background 
The Pop Group reunited in 2010 originally to tour, but eventually recorded and released their first new album in over 30 years, Citizen Zombie in 2015. The band released a live compilation entitled The Boys Whose Head Exploded in May, and in July announced they were back in the studio with producer Dennis Bovell, who produced their debut album Y in 1979. One month later the album was ready for preorder via PledgeMusic, and on August 31 they revealed the album title, artwork, and track listing in an interview with Fact Magazine. Singer Mark Stewart described the album as "a stand against manufactured hate" and "a hypersonic journey into a dystopian future full of alien encounters and sci-fi lullabies."

Release 
The album was released on October 28, 2016, and was preceded by the single "Zipperface."

Track listing

Personnel 
Adapted from the Honeymoon on Mars liner notes.

The Pop Group
 Dan Catsis – bass guitar
 Gareth Sager – guitar, saxophone, keyboards
 Bruce Smith – drums
 Mark Stewart – vocals

Technical
 Dennis Bovell – production (1, 3, 5–9), keyboards
 Dominic Lee – photography
 David McEwen – recording
 Kevin Metcalfe – mastering
 Hank Shocklee – production (2, 4, 10)
 Helen White – cover art
 Matt Wiggins – recording (5)

Release history

References

External links 
 
 Honeymoon on Mars at Bandcamp

2016 albums
The Pop Group albums